Craig McCracken (born March 31, 1971) is an American cartoonist, animator, director, writer, and producer known for creating the Cartoon Network's The Powerpuff Girls and Foster's Home for Imaginary Friends, Disney Channel and Disney XD's Wander Over Yonder and Netflix's Kid Cosmic.

Regarded as "one of the most successful creators of episodic comedy cartoons", his style was "at the forefront of a second wave of innovative, creator-driven television animation" in the 1990s, along with that of other animators such as Genndy Tartakovsky, and has been credited as "a staple of American modern animated television".

Early life and education
McCracken was born March 31, 1971, in Charleroi, Pennsylvania. He began drawing at an early age. He attended California High School in Whittier, California and the California Institute of the Arts (CalArts), where he met his friend and future collaborator, Genndy Tartakovsky. During his first year, he created a series of short cartoons featuring a character named No Neck Joe, which were picked up by Spike and Mike's Sick and Twisted Festival of Animation. While at CalArts, he also created a short entitled Whoopass Stew!, which would later become the basis for The Powerpuff Girls. McCracken married animator Lauren Faust on March 13, 2004. Faust took maternity leave in mid-2016 to take care of their newborn daughter, Quinn.

Career
In 1993, McCracken was hired by Hanna-Barbera Cartoons as an art director on the Turner Broadcasting System series 2 Stupid Dogs, alongside Tartakovsky. As his first job in the animation industry, he was "never really happy with how that [show] worked". While McCracken was at Hanna-Barbera, studio president Fred Seibert began a new project: an animation incubator consisting of 48 new cartoons running approximately seven minutes each. Dubbed What a Cartoon!, it motivated McCracken to further develop his Whoopass Girls! creation. He recalled that the network could not market a show with the word "ass" in it, so two friends of his came up with The Powerpuff Girls as a replacement for the original title. His new pilot, "The Powerpuff Girls in: Meat Fuzzy Lumkins", premiered on February 20, 1995, on Cartoon Network's World Premiere Toons-In, and a second short, "Crime 101", followed on January 28, 1996. The first short to be picked up by the network was Tartakovsky's Dexter's Laboratory, which McCracken would contribute to in early seasons. McCracken's Powerpuff was the fourth cartoon to be greenlit a full series, which premiered on November 18, 1998, with the final episode airing on March 25, 2005. The show has won Emmy and Annie awards. In 2002, McCracken directed The Powerpuff Girls Movie, a prequel to his series. The film received generally positive reviews but was a box office failure.

McCracken left The Powerpuff Girls after four seasons, focusing on his next project, Foster's Home for Imaginary Friends. It premiered with the 90-minute television special "House of Bloo's" on August 13, 2004, on Cartoon Network. He developed the series with wife Lauren Faust and Mike Moon. The show ran for six seasons, all directed by McCracken, and concluded on May 3, 2009. It also won Emmy and Annie awards.

In April 2008, he became executive producer of a new Cartoon Network showcase project called The Cartoonstitute. After 17 years of employment, he resigned from Cartoon Network in 2009, after it shifted focus to live-action and reality shows. He created Wander Over Yonder for Disney Television Animation and Disney Channel in August 2013. After Wander Over Yonder was cancelled, McCracken pitched a new show to Disney, based on his 2009 comic strip The Kid from Planet Earth. Disney ultimately passed on the project, and he eventually left the company in 2017. He then pitched his idea to Netflix and it was greenlight under the name of  Kid Cosmic. The show premiered on February 2, 2021 and ended on February 3, 2022. It is the first of McCracken's original works to have a serialized format and his return to the superhero genre since The Powerpuff Girls. He pitched 10 projects to Netflix in August 2021, but eventually left by April 2022 due to mass layoffs at Netflix Animation. 

On July 18, 2022, it was announced that McCracken would return to the Powerpuff Girls and Foster's Home for Imaginary Friends in the form of two reboots at Hanna-Barbera Studios Europe. Foster's Home will take form in a pre-school show focused on new characters.

In 2023, McCracken received the Winsor McCay Award at the Annie Awards ceremony for his "unparalleled achievement and exceptional contributions to animation".

Filmography

References

External links

 
 Craig McCracken's deviantART account
 
 Craig McCracken on Tumblr
 Craig McCracken on Instagram
 10 Questions: Craig McCracken

1971 births
Living people
20th-century American screenwriters
21st-century American screenwriters
Animators from Pennsylvania
American television directors
Television producers from Pennsylvania
American art directors
American animated film directors
American animated film producers
Annie Award winners
California Institute of the Arts alumni
American storyboard artists
American voice directors
Cartoon Network Studios people
Disney Television Animation people
Hanna-Barbera people
Netflix people
Showrunners
American television writers
American male screenwriters
Film directors from Pennsylvania
American male television writers
People from Charleroi, Pennsylvania
Primetime Emmy Award winners
Screenwriters from Pennsylvania
20th-century American male writers
21st-century American male writers